The 1994–95 NSL Cup (known as the Johnnie Walker Cup for sponsorship reasons) was the 19th season of the NSL Cup, a knock-out competition for National Soccer League clubs.

Melbourne Knights won the competition by defeating Heidelberg United in the final.

First round

Heidelberg United won 2–0 on aggregate.

South Melbourne won 7–3 on aggregate.

West Adelaide advance 2–2 on away goals.

NSW U23 won 3–2 on aggregate.

Melbourne Knights won 3–2 on aggregate.

Brisbane Strikers won 3–2 on aggregate

Sydney Olympic won 4–3 on aggregate.

Quarterfinals

Semifinals

Final

Top scorers
The top scorers in the 1994–95 NSL Cup were as follows:

References

NSL Cup
NSL Cup
1994 in Australian soccer
1995 in Australian soccer
NSL Cup seasons